Chaltenobatrachus is a monotypic genus of frogs in the family Batrachylidae. The sole species, Chaltenobatrachus grandisonae, used to be included Atelognathus, which is considered the sister taxon of Chaltenobatrachus.

C. grandisonae (common name: Puerto Eden frog) is endemic to Patagonia, including both Chile and Argentina. It inhabits rainforest and wetlands of the southern fjordlands and Andes in Patagonia. It is known from just few localities: its type locality, Puerto Eden, Wellington Island, Chile, and two mainland sites in Argentina.

Description
Back of the body and limbs are rather uniformly bright green with brown to reddish warts.

Reproduction
Females of this species lay their eggs in clusters attached to branches or stones under the water in still water, mostly temporary ponds. Each cluster has a few tens of eggs. Eggs are deposited in October (middle austral spring), and development to metamorphosis takes about 10–12 weeks, to December (early summer). In colder sites, development seems to take longer and tadpoles might overwinter.

References

Monotypic amphibian genera
Batrachylidae
Amphibians of Argentina
Amphibians of Chile
Amphibians of Patagonia
Taxonomy articles created by Polbot